The 11th Washington D.C. Area Film Critics Association Awards were held on December 10, 2012.

Winners and nominees
Best Film
 Zero Dark Thirty
 Argo
 Les Misérables
 Lincoln
 Silver Linings Playbook

Best Director
 Kathryn Bigelow – Zero Dark Thirty
 Ben Affleck – Argo
 Paul Thomas Anderson – The Master
 Tom Hooper – Les Misérables
 Steven Spielberg – Lincoln

Best Actor
 Daniel Day-Lewis – Lincoln
 John Hawkes – The Sessions
 Hugh Jackman – Les Misérables
 Joaquin Phoenix – The Master
 Denzel Washington – Flight

Best Actress
 Jessica Chastain – Zero Dark Thirty
 Marion Cotillard – Rust and Bone
 Jennifer Lawrence – Silver Linings Playbook
 Helen Mirren – Hitchcock
 Emmanuelle Riva – Amour

Best Supporting Actor
 Philip Seymour Hoffman – The Master
 Alan Arkin – Argo
 Javier Bardem – Skyfall
 Leonardo DiCaprio – Django Unchained
 Tommy Lee Jones – Lincoln

Best Supporting Actress
 Anne Hathaway – Les Misérables
 Amy Adams – The Master
 Samantha Barks – Les Misérables
 Sally Field – Lincoln
 Helen Hunt – The Sessions

Best Adapted Screenplay
 Silver Linings Playbook – David O. Russell Argo – Chris Terrio
 Life of Pi – David Magee
 Lincoln – Tony Kushner
 The Perks of Being a Wallflower – Stephen ChboskyBest Original Screenplay Looper – Rian Johnson Django Unchained – Quentin Tarantino
 The Master – Paul Thomas Anderson
 Moonrise Kingdom – Wes Anderson and Roman Coppola
 Zero Dark Thirty – Mark BoalBest Ensemble Les Misérables
 Argo
 Lincoln
 Moonrise Kingdom
 Zero Dark Thirty

Best Animated Film
 ParaNorman
 Brave
 Frankenweenie
 Rise of the Guardians
 Wreck-It Ralph

Best Documentary Film
 Bully
 The Imposter
 The Invisible War
 The Queen of Versailles
 Searching for Sugar Man

Best Foreign Language Film
 Amour • Austria
 The Intouchables • France
 I Wish • Japan
 A Royal Affair • Hungary
 Rust and Bone • Belgium

Best Art Direction
 Cloud Atlas
 Anna Karenina
 Les Misérables
 Lincoln
 Moonrise Kingdom

Best Cinematography
 Life of Pi
 Les Misérables
 The Master
 Skyfall
 Zero Dark Thirty

Best Score
 The Master – Jonny Greenwood
 Beasts of the Southern Wild – Dan Romer and Benh Zeitlin
 The Hobbit: An Unexpected Journey – Howard Shore
 Lincoln – John Williams
 Moonrise Kingdom – Alexandre Desplat

Best Youth Performance
 Quvenzhané Wallis – Beasts of the Southern Wild
 Jared Gilman – Moonrise Kingdom
 Kara Hayward – Moonrise Kingdom
 Tom Holland – The Impossible
 Logan Lerman – The Perks of Being a Wallflower

References

External links
 The Washington D.C. Area Film Critics Association

2012
2012 film awards